The 1945 Virginia State Trojans football team was an American football team that represented Virginia State College as a member of the Colored Intercollegiate Athletic Association (CIAA) during the 1945 college football season. In their 12th season under head coach Harry R. Jefferson, the team compiled an 8–0–2 record (6–0–1 against CIAA opponents), won the CIAA championship, and defeated  in the Piedmont Tobacco Bowl.

Schedule

References

Virginia State
Virginia State Trojans football seasons
college football undefeated seasons
Virginia State Trojans football